Sylvia García-Granados de Garay (born 4 October 1946) is a Guatemalan educator and businesswoman. She was the first wife of the former President of Guatemala and Mayor of Guatemala City Álvaro Arzú Irigoyen, they married in 1961, having three children: Roberto, Diego and María. Arzú and García divorced in 1981. García Granados remarried in 1986 with Gregorio Valdés O'Conell, with whom she had two daughters.

References

1946 births
People from Guatemala City
Living people
Arzú family